Fishing in the North Sea is concentrated in the southern part of the coastal waters. The main method of fishing is trawling.

Annual catches grew each year until the 1980s, when a high point of more than 3 million metric tons (3.3 million S/T) was reached. Since then, the numbers have fallen back to around 2.3 million tons (2.5 million S/T) annually with considerable differences between years. Besides the fish caught, it is estimated that 150,000 metric tons (165,000 S/T) of unmarketable by-catch are caught and around 85,000 metric tons (94,000 S/T) of dead and injured invertebrates.

Of the caught fish, about half are used for the production of fish oil and fish meal.

History 
Sturgeon, shad, rays, skates and salmon among other species were common in the North Sea into the 20th century, when numbers declined due to overfishing.

Other factors like the introduction of non-indigenous species, industrial and agricultural pollution, trawling and dredging, human-induced eutrophication, construction on coastal breeding and feeding grounds, sand and gravel extraction, offshore construction, and heavy shipping traffic have also contributed to the decline.

Various agreements have been made in the course of history. A 15th-century document illustrates shared use, and the "London convention on fisheries" was signed in 1964.

The OSPAR commission manages the OSPAR convention to counteract the harmful effects of human activity on wildlife in the North Sea, preserve endangered species, and provide environmental protection. All North Sea border states are signatories of the MARPOL 73/78 Accords which preserves the marine environment by preventing pollution from ships.  Germany, Denmark, and the Netherlands also have a trilateral agreement for the protection of the Wadden Sea, or mudflats, which run along the coasts of the three countries on the southern edge of the North Sea.

At the end of the 19th century large quantities of herring were produced in Scotland.
Today mainly mackerel, Atlantic cod, whiting, coalfish, European plaice, and sole are caught. In addition, common shrimp, lobster, and crab, along with a variety of shellfish are harvested.

Overfishing

In recent decades, overfishing has left many fisheries unproductive, disturbing the marine food chain dynamics and costing jobs in the fishing industry. Herring, cod and plaice fisheries may soon face the same plight as mackerel fishing which ceased in the 1970s due to overfishing.
Since the 1960s, various regulations have attempted to protect the stocks of fish such as limited fishing times and limited numbers of fishing boats, among other regulations. However, these rules were never systematically enforced and did not bring much relief. Since then, the United Kingdom and Denmark, two important fishing nations, became members of the EU, and have attempted, with the help of the Common Fisheries Policy, to bring the problem under control. Countries in the EU also have their own policies and laws in an attempt to address the problem of overfishing. The differing policies between countries have been blamed as the cause of tension between fishers, such as the 2012 English Channel scallop fishing dispute.

Norway, not a member of the EU, has also reached an agreement with the European Community concerning fishing policy. Regional advisory committees meet with the EU to help enforce policy.

In addition to threats due to food-chain disturbances, non-target species often wind up as victims of intense fishing. Sea turtles, dolphins, harbour porpoises, rays, and dozens of fish species are killed or injured by trawlers nets and beams. Denmark's trawler fishing alone accounts for the deaths of 5,000 porpoises a year.  Trawling can also have a destructive effect on seabed habitats as the trawler beams drag along the floor can uproot plants and destroy reefs.

All numbers from the FAO, cited by the University of British Columbia. For the FAO, the region "North Sea" includes Skagerrak and Kattegat

Notes

References
 Ilyina, P Ilyina (2007) The fate of persistent organic pollutants in the North Sea. Springer. )
 Karlsdóttir, Hrefna M (2005) Fishing on common grounds : the consequences of unregulated fisheries of North Sea herring in the postwar period. )

North Sea
North Sea
Fish of the North Sea
North Sea